Gorajec-Zagroble-Kolonia  is a settlement in the administrative district of Gmina Radecznica, within Zamość County, Lublin Voivodeship, in eastern Poland.

References

Gorajec-Zagroble-Kolonia